Northeastern Utah Educational Services (NU Center) is one of four regional service centers in Utah, United States, established to provide equitable and cost-effective services to nine rural school districts, to match those offered to students on Utah’s urban Wasatch Front.

The NU Center is located in Heber City, Utah, and serves the following school districts: 
 Daggett School District
 Duchesne School District
 Morgan School District
 North Summit School District
 Park City School District
 Rich School District
 South Summit School District
 Uintah School District
 Wasatch County School District

Services to the districts include technology support, special education and psychological services, and a purchasing cooperative.

Its sister rural service centers in Utah are Central Utah Educational Services (CUES), Southeastern Educational Service Center (SESC), and Southwestern Educational Development Center (SEDC).

References

External links
 

Education in Utah